The Cimitarra Fault is a sinistral oblique thrust fault in the departments of Antioquia, Bolívar and Santander in central Colombia.

Etymology 
The fault is named after the Cimitarra River, Antioquia, a left tributary of the Magdalena River.

Description 
The Cimitarra Fault splays from the Palestina Fault in a northeasterly direction on the eastern border of the Central Ranges of the Colombian Andes, passes north of Barrancabermeja, and possibly connects to the Bucaramanga-Santa Marta Fault in the northeast. The fault displaces Jurassic to Cretaceous volcanic rocks, Mesozoic igneous rocks, a Tertiary erosion surface in the Central Ranges, and late Quaternary sediments. Portions of the fault are pre-Pliocene in age, since it is locally covered by undeformed Pliocene sediments. Farther northeast, the fault is overlain by young alluvial deposits of the Middle Magdalena Valley.

The fault is marked by well preserved fault scarps, long straight traces, displaced drainages, and it forms aligned river courses.

See also 

 List of earthquakes in Colombia
 El Bagre Fault
 Honda Fault
 Ibagué Fault

References

Bibliography

Maps

Further reading 
 

Seismic faults of Colombia
Thrust faults
Strike-slip faults
Inactive faults
Faults
Faults
Faults
Faults